Rock'n Roll is a 2017 French comedy film written and directed by Guillaume Canet.

Cast
 Guillaume Canet as Guillaume Canet
 Marion Cotillard as Marion Cotillard
 Philippe Lefebvre as Philippe Lefebvre
 Camille Rowe as Camille Rowe
 Gilles Lellouche as Gilles Lellouche
 Yvan Attal as Yvan Attal
 Alain Attal as Alain Attal
 Johnny Hallyday as Johnny Hallyday
 Laeticia Hallyday as Laeticia Hallyday
 Maxim Nucci as Maxim Nucci
 Yarol Poupaud as Yarol Poupaud
 Kev Adams as Kev Adams
 Ben Foster as Ben Foster
 Pierre-Benoist Varoclier as Nico
 Tifenn Michel-Borgey as Lucien
 Fabrice Lamy as Fabrice
 Théo Kailer as Gaetan
Andy Picci as Andy Picci

Reception
On review aggregator website Rotten Tomatoes, the film holds an approval rating of 67%, based on 9 reviews, and an average rating of 5.8/10.

References

External links
 
 

2017 films
2010s French-language films
2017 comedy films
Films directed by Guillaume Canet
French comedy films
2010s French films